The collateral ligaments of the interphalangeal joints of the foot are fibrous bands that are situated on both sides of the interphalangeal joints of the toes.

Ligaments of the lower limb